Mohamed Khoutir Ziti (born April 19, 1990, in Sétif) is an Algerian football player who is currently playing for ES Sétif in the Algerian Ligue Professionnelle 1 and the Algeria national team. He plays as a right back.

Club career
On July 7, 2009, Ziti joined JS Kabylie on a free transfer from, signing a two-year contract with the club. In the 2009–10 season, the first with the club, he made 11 appearances, scoring a single goal.

On August 15, 2010, Ziti scored JS Kabylie's only goal in a 1–0 win over Egyptian club Al-Ahly in the group stage of the 2010 CAF Champions League.

International career
In May 2010, Ziti was called up to the Algerian Under-23 National Team for a training camp in Italy. On November 16, 2011, he was selected as part of Algeria's squad for the 2011 CAF U-23 Championship in Morocco.

References

External links
 
 

1989 births
2011 CAF U-23 Championship players
Algeria under-23 international footballers
Algerian footballers
Algerian Ligue Professionnelle 1 players
CS Constantine players
ES Sétif players
JS Kabylie players
Kabyle people
Living people
Footballers from Sétif
Algeria youth international footballers
Algeria international footballers
Association football fullbacks
21st-century Algerian people